João Pedro Salgado Nogueira (born 27 March 1986) is a Portuguese football player who plays for Fafe.

Club career
He made his professional debut in the Segunda Liga for Fafe on 6 August 2016 in a game against Braga B.

References

1986 births
People from Fafe
Living people
Portuguese footballers
Association football midfielders
AD Fafe players
Liga Portugal 2 players
Sportspeople from Braga District